Swimming at the 2017 Games of the Small States of Europe was held at the Multieventi Swimming Pool, San Marino from 30 May to 2 June 2017.

Medal table

Medalists

Men

Women

References

External links
Official results
Results book

2017 Games of the Small States of Europe
2017 in swimming
2017
Swimming in San Marino